Bangor Marina is the largest marina in Northern Ireland. It opened in 1989 on the southern shores of Belfast Lough, close to the Irish Sea cruising routes. The marina has become well known for providing a berth in the centre of Bangor. It has also been awarded Five Anchors by the Yachting Harbour Association.

Also based at the Marina are the Marine Court Hotel, HM Coast Guard's Marine Rescue Sub Centre and the Royal National Lifeboat Institution's Atlantic 85-class lifeboat Jessie Hillyard.

Gallery

References

External links
Bangor Marina

Marinas in Northern Ireland
Tourist attractions in County Down
Bangor, County Down